The Gatekeeper is a trilogy of books written by Christopher Golden and Nancy Holder based on the TV series Buffy the Vampire Slayer.

Volume 1: Out of the Madhouse

Plot summary

While Giles is in Manhattan for a librarian's meeting, the Scooby Gang finds that Sunnydale is suddenly overrun by demons. Meanwhile, Giles' hotel room in Manhattan is ransacked and he gets assaulted, which leads to him ending up in the hospital. Michaela Tomasi, a fellow Watcher, tries to warn him of something but disappears. Eventually Giles makes it back to Sunnydale. There they discover that portals from another realm are opening in Sunnydale which caused the drastic increase in the demon population. Giles figures that there must be something wrong at the Gatehouse, a huge mansion that is infested with demons but kept under control by Jean-Marc Regnier, a wizened sorcerer called the Gatekeeper. Giles, Buffy, Xander and Cordelia fly to Boston where the Gatehouse is located, while Willow, Oz and Angel remain in Sunnydale to ward off demons and the Sons of Entropy that seem to be stalking the Slayer. After Angel captures two Sons of Entropy, he learns, by beating them, that their boss, Il Maestro, is planning on opening the gates to other dimensions to let the demons run loose on the earth with the sons of Entropy as their kings and their immediate plan is to take over the Gatehouse in order to do this.

Oz takes off to Boston to warn Buffy of the Sons of Entropy. Meanwhile, in the Gatehouse the gang is fighting off hordes of demons and they somehow manage to survive. Xander locates the Gatekeeper who manages to regain control of the Gatehouse by securing the demons in their rooms with his magic. The Gatekeeper is frail and on the verge of death, only by immersing himself in the Cauldron of Bran the Blessed, can he continue to live past his 138 years. To keep the Gatehouse in order they must find his son who is somewhere in Europe. They decide to take the ghost roads, which is a realm ghosts wander endlessly if they cannot move on. These ghosts only allow those touched by the supernatural to pass, even though grudgingly. They envy the living. Oz takes the ghost road back to Sunnydale to get Angel, when they make it back to the mansion they discover that it's under attack. The spell fuelled by her friends’ and Angel's love must work its magic with the Gatekeeper's help in order to save Buffy's life

Continuity

Supposed to be set late in Buffy season 3.

Volume 2: Ghost Roads

Plot summary

In search of Jacques Regnier, the Gatekeeper's son, Buffy, Angel and Oz take off to London via the ghost roads while the rest of the gang returns to Sunnydale. The trio in England run into every possible problem; another fake Watcher leads them into a trap and the Sons of Entropy are hot on their heels. Back in Sunnydale the ghost ship the Flying Dutchman has arrived and are taking human prisoners aboard, including Giles. Meanwhile, Il Maestro pleads to his lord Belphegor to spare Micaela, his adopted daughter, from the pain and suffering humans will have to deal with when the evil breaks loose. Spike and Drusilla are busy keeping Jacques Regnier hidden until the Sons of Entropy give them what they want. Angel learns that Il Maestro is in Florence and the trio sets off for it. Buffy's mom is kidnapped by the Sons of Entropy and they plan to use Joyce as bait to bring the Slayer to them.
Back in Sunnydale Willow, Xander and Cordelia must figure out how to save Giles from the Flying Dutchman or he will be brought into hell when the boat leaves Sunnydale and no one makes it in to hell without dying first. In Boston the Gatehouse has become under attack again and though the Gatekeeper is weak he can still fend off the Sons of Entropy. Buffy, Angel and Oz infiltrate the Sons of Entropy base in Florence and are then captured by Il Maestro's men. There they learn that Il Mastero is an ancient sorcerer named Fulcaneli who was believed killed a long time ago. They manage to escape with the help of Micaela who realizes that what her father is doing is very wrong. They head back to Sunnydale along with Spike, Drusilla and Jacques Regnier via the ghost roads which is when Buffy learns that her mother has been captured and that Xander was shot during a rescue attempt. Buffy must rescue her mother from a fiery death...

Continuity

Supposed to be set late in Buffy season 3.
Amy Madison, still in human form, makes an appearance and saves Xander's life. This implies that the story took place before the episode "Gingerbread" in the third season.

Volume 3: Sons of Entropy

Plot summary

To save Xander's life Willow and Cordelia take the Ghost Roads to the Regnier house. When they get there they find that the Gatekeeper has died and Xander is immediately put into the Cauldron of Braun the Blessed. But the Cauldron recognizes Xander as the new heir and bestows all of the Gatekeeper's magickal power to a very surprised Xander. Back in Sunnydale, Joyce Summers has been captured by Fulcanelli. Giles is busy searching for where Joyce might be held and where the rightful heir to the Gatekeeper's line might be. The bloodline must be continued otherwise Xander's body may not be able to withstand the strain that the magic will do to his body. Ethan Rayne also appears, offering his help to a skeptical Buffy and friends. Buffy manages to save her mother in a maze that Fulcanelli designed, complete with Minotaur. Jacques, the new heir, escapes from Fulcanelli and joins Buffy's entourage. Oz and Angel lead Jacques through the Ghost Roads and back to the Gatekeeper's house where an assault is being conducted on Xander and his abilities. Further complicating things is Oz, who has become a werewolf at the most inopportune moment. But Jacques arrives and his powers are restored to him. Fulcanelli's men begin their assault again and Willow tries to help out with her binding and protection spells, binding Oz into the house when he attacks. But the house begins to crumble in on itself while back in Sunnydale, after using a Sphere of Order to hold back the demons, they manage to break through when Fulcaneli's demon master Belphegor, one of the Lords of Hell, escapes from Hell.  Buffy battles Belphegor and thanks to a momentary telepathic connection with the unconscious Ethan, learns that no weapon will work against Belphegor, only brute force.  After discovering that Belphegor has a third human eye and realizing that its part of the riddle that describes how to kill him, and rips it out and finally manages to beat Belphegor to death.  With Belphegor's death, Fulacneli, who is connected to him, is also destroyed and Belphegor's human eye turns into a portal to Hell that sucks in all the demons that escaped.

Continuity

Supposed to be set late in Buffy season 3.

Canonical issues

Buffy novels such as these are not usually considered by fans as canonical. Some fans consider them stories from the imaginations of authors and artists, while other fans consider them as taking place in an alternative fictional reality. However unlike fan fiction, overviews summarising their story, written early in the writing process, were 'approved' by both Fox and Joss Whedon (or his office), and the books were therefore later published as officially Buffy merchandise.

External links

Reviews

Book I
Litefoot1969.bravepages.com - Review of book one by Litefoot
Nika-summers.com - Review of book one by Nika Summers

Book II
Litefoot1969.bravepages.com - Review of book two by Litefoot
Teen-books.com - Reviews Book II
Nika-summers.com - Review of book two by Nika Summers

Book III
Litefoot1969.bravepages.com - Review of book three by Litefoot
Teen-books.com - Reviews Book III
Nika-summers.com - Review of book three by Nika Summers

1999 novels
Novel series
Books based on Buffy the Vampire Slayer